Tarucus kulala, the Turkana Pierrot, is a butterfly in the family Lycaenidae. It is found in Somalia (Ogaden) and northern Kenya.

Adults have been recorded feeding from the flowers of Loewia tanaensis.

The larvae probably feed on Ziziphus species.

References

Butterflies described in 1955
Tarucus